Dante Alfonso Delgado Rannauro (born 23 December 1950) is a Mexican politician, lawyer, and diplomat who is the national coordinator and co-founder of the Citizens' Movement political party. He has served as Interim Governor of Veracruz, as Ambassador of Mexico to Italy, as Senator of the LX Legislature of the Mexican Congress representing Veracruz, and as Deputy during the LIII Legislature.

References

1950 births
Living people
Politicians from Veracruz
Members of the Senate of the Republic (Mexico)
Members of the Chamber of Deputies (Mexico)
Citizens' Movement (Mexico) politicians
Ambassadors of Mexico to Italy
21st-century Mexican politicians
People from Alvarado, Veracruz
Universidad Veracruzana alumni
20th-century Mexican politicians